Ka-Sing Lam was a former actor and Cantonese opera singer from Hong Kong. Lam is credited with over 300 films.

Early life 
On January 18, 1933, Lam was born as Lam Man Shun in Hong Kong. Lam's ancestry origin was from Dongguan, Guangdong province, China. Lam's sister is Lam Kar-Yee. In 1936, Lam's mother died. Lam and his sister were raised up by their father. When Hong Kong was under Japanese occupation, Lam's family fled from Hong Kong to Guangzhou, China, and returned to Hong Kong later. At the age of 10, Lam became a student under Tang Chiu Lan-fong.

Career 
In 1944, at age 11, Lam began his Cantonese opera career. In 1947 at age 14, Lam's acting career started. Lam first appeared in Prostituting to Raise the Orphan, a 1947 Cantonese opera film directed by Hung Chung-Ho. In 1966, Lam founded Tsung Sun Sing Troupe in performing Cantonese opera on stage.

Lam's last film was Madame Lee Sze-Sze
(aka Li Shi-Shi), a 1967 Cantonese opera film directed by Wong Hok-Sing. Lam is credited with over 300 films.

In Cantonese opera, Lam's singing is known as Sing style.

Repertoire 
This is a partial list.
 The Marriage of the Top Scholar
 The Dream Encounter Between Emperor Wu of Han and Lady Wa
 Time To Go Home, a (Sit Gok Sin, Lam's master) classic 
 The Butterfly Lovers (two versions)
 Lu Wen-long
 Bao and Dai of Red Chamber
 War and Never-ending Love
 Romance and Hatred
 Merciless Sword Under Merciful Heaven (aka Paragons and Heroism) 
 The Sounds of Battle
 The Story of Chu Pin's Loyalty to the Sung Dynasty
 Uproar in Jade Hall
 A Chronicle Written in Blood
 Lam Chung (aka Lin Chong)
 The Jade Disc
 Wu Song
 Zhou Yu
 Who Should Be the Commander-in-Chief?

Theater Performance 
This is a partial list.
 Passing of Sit Kok Sin in 1956
- Time To Go Home
- The Marriage of the Top Scholar
- The Dream Encounter Between Emperor Wu of Han and Lady Wa
 July 1957 with Yim-hing Law
- Lady White Snake
- Queen of the Stage (aka Marriage Is a Life-Long Business)
 1967, United States with Ho-Kau Chan
 1971, United States
- Invitation originated from 1967 for Kwun-Lai Ng and her Lai Sing Opera Troupe but Ng could not get the necessary documents to perform in the United States that year.
 1976, 1st Festival of Asian Arts
 1976, United States
 1977, 2nd Festival of Asian Arts
- Lu Wen-long
- Bao and Dai of Red Chamber
 1978, 6th Hong Kong Arts Festival
- Butterfly Lovers
- War and Never-ending Love by playwright Poon Cheuk
 1978, 3rd Festival of Asian Arts
 1980, 5th Festival of Asian Arts
 1981, Singapore (17 titles for 2 weeks, hopefully 3 weeks, repeated four titles for more days, extended to 22 January 1981)
- Lam Kar Sing Cantonese Opera Troupe was brought to the Kreta Ayer People's Theatre by IME United instead of the Kreta Ayer People's Theatre like other troupes such as the one in 1974 led by Madam Choo Sow Ying, to help funds drive.
- Proceeds of the first night was donated by Lam's troupe to the People's Theatre Foundation. (Guangdong Cantonese Opera Troupe grossed $150,000 in 1980.)
 1981, North America
- Invitation was from Chee Kung Tong (aka Gee Kung Tong) of Hongmen
 1982, 7th Festival of Asian Arts
 1984, Chinese Opera Fortnight
- Time To Go Home, a (Sit Gok Sin, Lam's master) classic
- The Sounds of Battle (aka The Battling Sounds, 1963 film version)
- Romance and Hatred
- Merciless Sword Under Merciful Heaven (aka The Pitiless Sword, 1964 film version)

Filmography

Films 
This is a partial list of films.
 1947 Prostituting to Raise the Orphan
 1955 Parents' Hearts
 1960 Three Females - Ho Chi-Hung.
 1962 Battle at Sizhou
 1963 The Battling Sounds
 1964 The Pitiless Sword
 1967 Uproar in Jade Hall - Cheung Kim-Chau.
 1967 Madame Lee Sze-Sze (aka Li Shi-Shi)

Discography 
This is a partial list.
 1968, Of Love and Enmity
 1969, Why Not Return? (2xLP, Gat)
 1969, Lam Chung
 1970, Drums Along the Battlefield (LP, Album)
 1971, The Revenge Battle 
 Meeting at the Pavilion (aka Butterfly Lovers)
 The Story of Chu Pin's Loyalty to the Sung Dynasty

Awards 
 2006 Star. Avenue of Stars. Tsim Sha Tsui waterfront in Hong Kong.
 2010 Honorary Doctorates. Presented by the Hong Kong Academy for Performing Arts.
 2012 Silver Bauhinia Star.

Personal life 
In 1962, Lam married Hong Dou-zi (d. 2009), a Cantonese opera singer. They have two sons. In 1993, Lam and his family moved from Hong Kong to Toronto, Canada. In 2003, Lam's younger son committed suicide in Hong Kong. In 2009, after Lam's wife's death from cancer in Toronto, Canada, he returned to Hong Kong.

Lam suffered from Parkinson's disease. Lam resided in Kowloon Tong area, Hong Kong. On August 4, 2015, Lam died in Kwong Wah Hospital in Yau Ma Tei area, Kowloon, Hong Kong. Lam was 82 years old.

See also
 Kwun-Lai Ng
 Bo-Ying Lee
 Ho-Kau Chan

References

External links 
 Cantonese opera master Lam Ka-sing dies in Hong Kong, aged 82 at scmp.com (August 5, 2015)(Required paid subscription)
 Lam Kar Sing at starlightopera.com
 Exhibition to showcase Cantonese opera collection donated by renowned artist Lam Kar Sing (with photos)
 Historical Dictionary of Hong Kong Cinema, p.247 By Lisa Odham Stokes, Rachel Braaten
 Ka-Sing Lam at hkmdb

1933 births
2015 deaths
Hong Kong Buddhists
Hong Kong male film actors
Hong Kong male Cantonese opera actors